Pasión Española is a 2008 album by Plácido Domingo with Miguel Roa and the Madrid Community Orchestra from Deutsche Grammophon which won a Latin Grammy Award.

Track listing
"Falsa Moneda"    – Juan Mostazo Morales
"La Cruz De Mayo" – Manuel Font De Anta
"La Bien Pagá"  – Juan Mostazo Morales
"Porque Te Quiero" – Genaro Monreal Lacosta
"El Día Que Nací Yo" – Juan Mostazo Morales*
"¡Ay, Maricruz!"  – Manuel López-Quiroga Miquel
"Me Embrujaste" – Manuel López-Quiroga Miquel
"Cariño Verdá"  – Genaro Monreal Lacosta*
"Te Lo Juro Yo"  – Manuel López-Quiroga Miquel
"¡No Me Quieras Tanto!"  – Manuel López-Quiroga Miquel
"Antonio Vargas Heredia"  – Francisco Merenciano Bosch, Juan Mostazo Morales*
"Ojos Verdes"  – Manuel López-Quiroga Miquel
"Suspiros De España"  – Antonio Álvarez Alonso

References

2008 albums
Plácido Domingo albums